Michael Naughton (1873 – 18 August 1959) was a New Zealand cricketer. He played in one first-class match for Wellington in 1897/98.

See also
 List of Wellington representative cricketers

References

External links
 

1873 births
1959 deaths
New Zealand cricketers
Wellington cricketers
Place of birth missing